A list of films released in Japan in 1976 (see 1976 in film).

See also
1976 in Japan
1976 in Japanese television

External links
 

1976
Lists of 1976 films by country or language
Films